Nabur is a village and municipality in the Gobustan Rayon of Azerbaijan.  It has a population of 2,726.  The municipality consists of the villages of Nabur and Cəngi.

Notable people
Alim Qasimov, mugham singer

References 

Populated places in Gobustan District